In Marxist theory, society consists of two parts: the base (or substructure) and superstructure. The base refers to the mode of production which includes the forces and relations of production (e.g. employer–employee work conditions, the technical division of labour, and property relations) into which people enter to produce the necessities and amenities of life. The superstructure refers to society's other relationships and ideas not directly relating to production including its culture, institutions, political power structures, roles, rituals, religion, media, and state. The relation of the two parts is not strictly unidirectional. The superstructure can affect the base. However, the influence of the base is predominant.

Model and qualification
In developing Alexis de Tocqueville's observations, Marx identified civil society as the economic base and political society as the political superstructure. Marx postulated the essentials of the base–superstructure concept in his preface to A Contribution to the Critique of Political Economy (1859):

Marx's "base determines superstructure" axiom, however, requires qualification:
the base is the whole of productive relationships, not only a given economic element, e.g. the working class
historically, the superstructure varies and develops unevenly in society's different activities; for example, art, politics, economics, etc.
the base–superstructure relationship is reciprocal; Engels explains that the base determines the superstructure only in the last instance.

Applications and revisions 
Marx's theory of base and superstructure can be found in the disciplines of political science, sociology, anthropology, and psychology as utilized by Marxist scholars. Across these disciplines the base-superstructure relationship, and the contents of each, may take different forms.

Max Weber
Early sociologist Max Weber preferred a form of structuralism over a base and superstructure model of society in which he proposes that the base and superstructure are reciprocal in causality—neither economic rationality nor normative ideas rule the domain of society. In summarizing results from his East Elbia research he notes that, contrary to the base and superstructure model "we have become used to," there exists a reciprocal relationship between the two.

Antonio Gramsci
The Italian political philosopher Antonio Gramsci divided Marx's superstructure into two elements: political society and civil society. Political society consists of the organized force of society (such as the police and military) while civil society refers to the consensus-creating elements that contribute to cultural hegemony (such as the media and education system.) Both constituents of this superstructure are still informed by the values of the base, serving to establish and enforce these values in society.

Walter Rodney 
Walter Rodney, the Guyanese political activist and African historian, discussed the role of Marx's superstructure in the context of development cycles and colonialism. Rodney states that while most countries follow a developmental structure that evolves from feudalism to capitalism, China is an exception to this rule and skipped the capitalism step: The explanation is very complex, but in general terms the main differences between feudal Europe and feudal China lay in the superstructure – i.e. in the body of beliefs, motivations and sociopolitical institutions which derived from the material base but in turn affected it. In China, religious, educational and bureaucratic qualifications were of utmost importance, and government was in the hands of state officials rather than being run by the landlords on their own feudal estates. By extension this means that the Marxist development cycle is malleable due to cultural superstructures, and is not an inevitable path. Rather the role of the superstructure allows for adaptation of the development cycle, especially in a colonial context.

Freudo-Marxism and sex-economy
Freudo-Marxist Wilhelm Reich's discipline of analysis known as sex economy is an attempt to understand the divergence of the perceived base and superstructure that occurred during the global economic crisis from 1929 to 1933. To make sense of this phenomenon, Reich recategorized social ideology as an element in the base—not the superstructure. In this new categorization, social ideology and social psychology is a material process that self-perpetuates, the same way economic systems in the base perpetuate themselves. Reich focused on the role of sexual repression in the patriarchal family system as a way to understand how mass support for Fascism could arise in a society.

Critical theory
Contemporary Marxist interpretations such as those of critical theory reject this interpretation of the base–superstructure interaction and examine how each affects and conditions the other. Raymond Williams, for example, argues against loose, "popular" usage of base and superstructure as discrete entities which, he explains, is not the intention of Marx and Engels:

Can the base be separated from the superstructure?
John Plamenatz makes two counterclaims regarding the clear-cut separation of the base and superstructure. The first is that economic structure is independent from production in many cases, with relations of production or property also having a strong effect on production.
The second claim is that relations of production can only be defined with normative terms—this implies that social life and humanity's morality cannot be truly separated as both are defined in a normative sense.

The legality question
A criticism of the base and superstructure theory is that property relations (supposedly part of the base and the driving force of history) are actually defined by legal relations, an element of the superstructure. Defenders of the theory claim that Marx believed in property relations and social relations of production as two separate entities.

Neoliberalism and the state
Colin Jenkins provides (2014) a critique on the role of the capitalist state in the era of neoliberalism, using base and superstructure theory as well as the work of Nicos Poulantzas. Regarding developments in the United States during this era (roughly 1980–2015), Jenkins highlights the nature in which political parties and the political system itself are inherently designed to protect the economic base of capitalism and, in doing so, have become "increasingly centralized, coordinated, and synchronized over the past half-century." This, according to Jenkins, has led to a "corporate-fascistic state of being" that is challenging the equilibrium of this fragile relationship. His analysis specifically addresses the role of both major parties, Democrats and Republicans, in the United States:

Triviality
Neven Sesardic agrees that the economic base of society affects its superstructure, however he questions how meaningful this actually is. While the original claim of a strong form of economic determinism was radical, Sesardic argues that it was watered down to the trivial claim that the base affects the superstructure and vice versa, something no philosopher would dispute. Thus Sesardic argues that Marx's claim ultimately amounts to nothing more than a trivial observation that does not make meaningful statements or explain anything about the real world.

See also
 Althusser
 Classical Marxism
 Criticism of Marxism
 Critique of political economy
 Cultural hegemony
 Dialectical materialism
 Economic determinism
 False consciousness
 Historical materialism
 Ideology and Ideological State Apparatuses
 Materialism
 Reification
 Social change
 Social structure

References

Further reading
 Althusser, Louis and Balibar, Étienne. Reading Capital. London: Verso, 2009.
 Bottomore, Tom (ed). A Dictionary of Marxist Thought, 2nd ed. Malden, Massachusetts: Blackwell Publishing, 1991. 45–48.
 Calhoun, Craig (ed), Dictionary of the Social Sciences Oxford University Press (2002)
 Hall, Stuart. "Rethinking the Base and Superstructure Metaphor." Papers on Class, Hegemony and Party. Bloomfield, J., ed. London: Lawrence & Wishart, 1977.
 Chris Harman. "Base and Superstructure". International Socialism 2:32, Summer 1986, pp. 3–44.
 Harvey, David. A Companion to Marx's Capital. London: Verso, 2010.
 Larrain, Jorge. Marxism and Ideology. Atlantic Highlands, New Jersey: Humanities Press, 1983.
 Lukács, Georg. History and Class Consciousness. Cambridge, Massachusetts: MIT Press, 1972.
 Postone, Moishe. Time, Labour, and Social Domination: A Reinterpretation of Marx's Critical Theory. Cambridge [England]: Cambridge University Press, 1993.
 Williams, Raymond. Marxism and Literature. Oxford: Oxford University Press, 1977.

External links
 Marxist Media Theory

Marxist terminology
Marxist theory
Marxian economics
Sociological terminology